Charles Woodworth may refer to:

 Charles E. Woodworth (1897–1966), American entomologist
 Charles W. Woodworth (1865–1940), American entomologist